HC Dukla Jihlava, founded in 1956, is an ice hockey team in the Czech Republic.  It won the Czechoslovak Extraliga title 12 times: six consecutive championships beginning in 1967, then in 1974, four consecutive championships beginning in 1982, and again in 1991. As of 2019, HC Dukla Jihlava plays in the Czech 1. liga after being relegated from the Czech Extraliga in 2017–18.

Some of its prominent players have included Jaroslav Holík, Jiří Holík, Jan Klapáč, Jan Suchý, Ladislav Šmíd senior, Miloš Podhorský, Jan Hrbatý, Josef Augusta, Milan Chalupa, Jaroslav Benák, Petr Vlk, Libor Dolana, Igor Liba, Oldřich Válek, Dominik Hašek, Jiří Crha and Bedřich Ščerban.

Honours

Domestic
Czech 1. Liga
  Winners (4): 1999–2000, 2003–04, 2015–16, 2021–22
  Runners-up (3): 2001–02, 2002–03, 2016–17
  3rd place (4): 2000–01, 2010–11, 2013–14, 2018–19

Czechoslovak Extraliga
  Winners (12): 1966–67, 1967–68, 1968–69, 1969–70, 1970–71, 1971–72, 1973–74, 1981–82, 1982–83, 1983–84, 1984–85, 1990–91
  Runners-up (7): 1965–66, 1972–73, 1976–77, 1978–79, 1979–80, 1985–86, 1986–87
  3rd place (5): 1961–62, 1963–64, 1974–75, 1975–76, 1987–88

International
IIHF European Cup
  Runners-up (5): 1967–68, 1970–71, 1974–75, 1982–83, 1983–84
  3rd place (1): 1984–85

Spengler Cup
  Winners (5): 1965, 1966, 1968, 1978, 1982
  Runners-up (5): 1970, 1971, 1977, 1983, 1984

External links 
 

Ice hockey teams in the Czech Republic
Ice hockey teams in Czechoslovakia
Military sports clubs
Sport in Jihlava
Ice hockey clubs established in 1956
1956 establishments in Czechoslovakia